Ruthe Blalock Jones (born 1939) is a Delaware-Shawnee-Peoria painter and printmaker from Oklahoma.

Background
Ruthe Blalock Jones was born on June 8, 1939 in Claremore, Oklahoma. Her parents are Joe and Lucy Parks Blalock. Her tribal name is Chulundit. She is enrolled with the Shawnee Tribe. Her father Joe Blalock was Shawnee/Peoria and her mother Lucy Parks Blalock was Delaware. She is a member of the Horse Clan of the Lower Band of Shawnee.

She earned an associate degree from Bacone College in 1970. She then earned a bachelor of fine arts degree from the University of Tulsa in 1972. In 1985 she attended the University of Oklahoma and earned her master's degree from Northeastern State University in 1989. Her art career began much earlier, when she was ten years old and students under Charles Banks Wilson.

Art career
At the age of 13, Jones entered her first juried art show at the Philbrook Museum of Art and received an honorable mention. She works in oil, acrylic, watercolor, pen and ink, and pencil as well as printing monotypes.

Her first art award was an honorable mention at the Philbrook Art Museum's annual show in 1954, when Jones was 15 years old. In 1995 she was inducted in the Oklahoma Women's Hall of Fame. In 2011, she was named the Red Earth Festival's Honored One. In 2014 she was awarded the American Indian Circle of Honor Award by the Tulsa City-County Library.

"Ruthe's art speaks volumes about the pride of her tribal relationships. ... She pays acute attention to authenticity in detail of dress and the ceremonial aspects of traditional tribal life, and some of her paintings could easily be her childhood recollections," writes art historian Dr. Mary Jo Watson (Seminole). "Ruthe has many talents maybe others are not aware (of). She is a champion hoop dancer, war dancer and excellent cook."

Public collections
Ruthe Jones' work can be found in the following public collections:

Bacone College
Five Civilized Tribes Museum
Heard Museum
George Gustav Heye Center
Murrow Indian's Children's Home
Northeastern State University
Okmulgee Public School System
Philbrook Museum of Art
Red Earth Museum
Sequoyah National Research Center
Southern Plains Indian Museum
Tulsa Performing Arts Center
University of Tulsa
United States Department of the Interior

Published works
"Delaware Commentaries." Grumet, Robert Steven, ed. Voices from the Delaware Big House Ceremony. Norman: University of Oklahoma Press, 2001. .
"The Bread Dance: A Shawnee Ceremony of Thanks of Renewal." Townsend, Richard F., ed. Hero, Hawk, and Open Hand: American Indian Art of the Ancient Midwest and South. New Haven: Yale University Press, 2004. .

Notes

References
 Lester, Patrick D. The Biographical Directory of Native American Painters. Norman: University of Oklahoma Press, 1995. .

External links
Ruthe Blalock Jones online profile
Ruthe Blalock Jones online portfolio
 Ruthe Jones entry in the Encyclopedia of Oklahoma History and Culture
 Oral History Interview with Ruthe Blalock Jones Oklahoma Oral History Research Program at the OSU Library

1939 births
Living people
People from Claremore, Oklahoma
Native American painters
Native American printmakers
Painters from Oklahoma
Peoria people
Shawnee Tribe people
Lenape people
Bacone College alumni
Northeastern State University alumni
University of Tulsa alumni
American women painters
20th-century American women artists
American women printmakers
20th-century American printmakers
Native American women artists
21st-century American women artists
20th-century Native Americans
21st-century Native Americans
20th-century Native American women
21st-century Native American women